Epidemic Marketing was a short-lived dot-com company headquartered in Denver, Colorado that operated in the viral marketing sector. Before it closed its doors in June 2000, it employed approximately 60 people. Its website was located at www.epidemic.com.

Operation
Epidemic attempted to generate marketing revenue by paying customers to attach links to internet businesses in their outgoing mail. Presumably, after seeing their websites jump in popularity, clients would pay Epidemic a greater amount than was paid to customers.

Although Epidemic considered its efforts as viral marketing, it operated in a very similar fashion to spam and bot nets, albeit with willing end-users who were receiving paid compensation.

History
The company was launched in September 1999. It raised $7.6 million in venture capital in its first round of financing.

The company spent $1.6 million to secure a 30-second ad during Super Bowl XXXIV. According to national account manager James Wallen, the ad drew "little response from consumers but helped to attract important business partners."

Business plans apparently failed and the company attempted to merge with a California-based firm. When this failed, the company shuttered in June 2000.

Unrelated SEO company
As of April 2018, there exists an unrelated Denver-based search engine optimization company also named Epidemic Marketing.

See also
 Computer.com
 Dot-com commercials during Super Bowl XXXIV
 Dot-com bubble

References

1999 establishments in Colorado
2000 disestablishments in Colorado
Companies based in Denver
Internet properties disestablished in 2000
Marketing companies established in 1999
Defunct companies based in Colorado
Defunct online companies of the United States
Dot-com bubble
Marketing companies of the United States
Internet properties established in 1999